USS Pelican may refer to the following ships of the United States Navy:

 , laid down 10 November 1917 at Gas Engine and Power Co., Morris Heights, New York
 , laid down as YMS–441 on 27 November 1943 by Robert Jacob Inc., City Island, New York
 , an Osprey-class coastal mine hunter

See also
 , a United States Bureau of Fisheries fisheries science research vessel in service from 1930 to 1940 which then served in the Fish and Wildlife Service fleet as the fishery patrol vessel US FWS Pelican from 1940 to 1958

References 

United States Navy ship names